Mizri Ghar at  is the third highest mountain in the Sulaiman Mountains of Western Pakistan. Mizri Ghar is located in Sub-Tehsil Zimri Palaseen of District Musakhail, Balochistan. In summer, Mizri Ghar receives a high amount of rainfall while in winter season it receives a considerable amount of snowfall, sometimes 4 to 5 ft. Its climate is very cool even in summer and its temperature is comparable to Naran, Kaghan, and Murree. This climate uniqueness of Mizri Ghar makes it one of the coldest tourist points in Baluchistan and makes it attractive for the tourists of the adjoining areas such as Zhob, Loralai, D I Khan, DG Khan, and even Multan.

Greenery and Wildlife 

Mizri Ghar and the surrounding peaks, are predominantly covered with vegetation. The vegetation includes Chilgoza Pine, Wild Olive, and other shrubs and grasses. It has green lush valleys on its top. The top area is about 30 km long and 2 to 3 km wide. Chilghoza Pine is one of the sources of livelihood of locals in Zimri Palaseen.

A few decades ago, Mizri Ghar was full of wildlife such as Suleman Markhor, Common leopard, fox, wolf, Asiatic steppe wild cat, and Hyaena. There were herds of Suleman Markhor in these mountains but due to poaching, these animals are depleting very quickly nowadays.

The local social activists have repeatedly requested the Government and international organizations working for wildlife to help in saving these animals from extinction. They have also requested to declare the top of the Mizri Ghar as "Wild Sanctuary or National Park for Wildlife". This will help in providing a safe environment for these animals which will result in growing the number of these wildlife. When the number of these Markhor is increased, then Trophy Hunting may be started like in Gilgit Baltistan. This will attract local and international tourism and will boost the local economy.

See also
 List of Ultras of the Karakoram and Hindu Kush

References

Mountains of Balochistan (Pakistan)
Three-thousanders of the Hindu Kush